Leonardo Bartholo Prando (born May 24, 1987 in Foz do Iguaçu), or simply Léo , is a Brazilian midfielder. He currently plays for União Beltrão.

Career
In April 2019, Léo Bartholo joined Maringá.

Honours

Club
 Santa Cruz
Pernambuco State League: 2011

References

External links
 

1987 births
Living people
Brazilian footballers
Brazilian expatriate footballers
People from Foz do Iguaçu
Association football forwards
Campeonato Brasileiro Série A players
Campeonato Brasileiro Série B players
Campeonato Brasileiro Série C players
Campeonato Brasileiro Série D players
Leo Bartholo
Treze Futebol Clube players
Foz do Iguaçu Futebol Clube players
Santa Cruz Futebol Clube players
Botafogo de Futebol e Regatas players
Clube Atlético Bragantino players
Botafogo Futebol Clube (SP) players
Mogi Mirim Esporte Clube players
Esporte Clube Tigres do Brasil players
Clube Atlético Tricordiano players
Boa Esporte Clube players
Leo Bartholo
FC Cascavel players
Maringá Futebol Clube players
Clube Esportivo União players
Brazilian expatriate sportspeople in Thailand
Expatriate footballers in Thailand
Sportspeople from Paraná (state)